Dankwart Danckwerts (14 March 1933, in Hamburg – 11 May 2012, in Hamburg) was a German sociologist.

After some time in business he qualified in (Sociology and Economics), graduated at the Hamburg University, 1960, and worked after that at the University of Münster with Helmut Schelsky, where he gained his doctoral degree (Dr. sc. pol.), 1963.

After doing field work in Chile, he was called to a chair of Sociology at the University of Duisburg up to 1998, where he, besides in general theory,  specialized in sociology of transportation. He remained active in sociological research.

A Festschrift was published on his 65th birthday in 1998.

References

German sociologists
1933 births
2012 deaths
University of Hamburg alumni
German male writers